Fešák Hubert  is a Czech comedy film directed by Ivo Novák. It was released in 1984.

Cast
 Karel Heřmánek - Hubert Hrabě
 Petr Kostka - Mourek
 Josef Somr - Pašek
 Pavel Zedníček - Eman
 Otto Lackovič - Skákal
 Pavel Nový - Karel
 Jan Teplý - Holendr
 Zora Kerova - Růža (as Zora-Ulla Keslerová)
 Lubomír Lipský - Franc
 Evelyna Steimarová - Pašková
 Lubomír Kostelka - Špirk
 Jiří Holý - Kropas
 Viktor Maurer - Lón
 Jana Šulcová - Kropasová
 Ladislava Kozderková - Čuříková

External links
 

1984 films
Czechoslovak comedy films
1984 comedy films
Czech comedy films
1980s Czech-language films
Films scored by Petr Hapka
1980s Czech films